The USBWA National Freshman of the Year, with the men's and women's versions respectively named the Wayman Tisdale Award and Tamika Catchings Award, is an annual basketball award given to college basketball's most outstanding freshman male player and female player by the United States Basketball Writers Association, an association of college basketball journalists. The award was first given following the 1988–89 season for men, while the 2002–03 season marked the first season for the women's award.

There has never been a tie for the men's award but there have been two for the women, with Tasha Humphrey of Georgia and Candice Wiggins of Stanford sharing the 2004–05 award and Paige Bueckers of UConn and Caitlin Clark of Iowa sharing honors in 2020–21. Only four players have been named the National Player of the Year (by receiving the Naismith or Wooden awards for either men or women) in the same season as being named the USBWA Freshman of the Year. Among men's players, Kevin Durant of Texas was the first in 2006–07, followed by Anthony Davis of Kentucky in 2011–12 and Zion Williamson of Duke in 2018–19. The first woman to receive both honors was Bueckers in 2020–21. Chris Jackson and Seimone Augustus, the two inaugural award winners for the men and women, respectively, were coincidentally both players at LSU.

On July 26, 2010, the USBWA announced that they would rename the men's National Freshman of the Year award after the late Wayman Tisdale, who in 1983 was named a first-team All-American as a freshman at Oklahoma. The women's award was officially named in honor of Tamika Catchings on October 17, 2019. As a freshman at Tennessee in 1997–98, she averaged 18.2 points for the undefeated national champion Lady Volunteers. Catchings went on to be named a three-time USBWA All-American and the organization's national player of the year in 2000 before playing 16 seasons in the WNBA, retiring as the league's all-time leader in rebounds, steals, and made free throws, plus second in points. She also won four Olympic gold medals with the USA national team.

Key

Winners

Footnotes

References
General

Specific

External links
Wayman Tisdale Award

Awards established in 1989
College basketball trophies and awards in the United States
College sports freshman awards